The 1987 North Korean embassy attack in Lima was a terrorist attack that took place on April 30, 1987, against the trade office and official residence of the delegation of the East Asian country in Peru. The attack left two people injured.

Background
North Korea, like China and the Soviet Union, turned its back on the communist Shining Path insurgency in Peru, despite leftist ideological similarities; mainly due to North Korean economic interests in the South American country during the government of Alan García.

In 1986, the Peruvian government bought 10,000 AK-47s of Soviet origin from the North Korean government. These weapons were intended to improve the weapons of the Peruvian National Police to counter the Senderista insurgency.

Attack
The attack began at midmorning on April 30, 1987, by a group of three individuals, two men and a woman carrying a briefcase. The group entered the plaza outside the embassy where they ran into the doorbell of the main building, taking hostage a Peruvian worker from the site who answered the doorbell.

The woman who led the attack carried around 35 sticks of dynamite in her briefcase, installed at the main interior door of the embassy, which was exploded, affecting the entire building and two more nearby houses. Although the explosion was powerful, at the time of the attack the North Korean embassy was understaffed. In addition to the hostage, another employer at the site was injured in the face by flying glass.

The attackers fled in a car, the North Korean representative Kim Shan Sik at the time of the attack was in his private home in downtown Lima.

Another attack was attempted in 1989, but the bomb did not detonate as it was defused by the Peruvian Police.

See also
Japanese embassy hostage crisis
1986 Soviet embassy attack in Lima
Deng Xiaoping's dogs

References

Terrorist incidents in 1987
Shining Path
History of Lima
1987 in Peru
Attacks on diplomatic missions in Peru
April 1987 crimes
April 1987 events in South America